The Welsh National Road Race Championships are held annually, and include several categories of rider.

Men

Senior

Veteran

Junior

Women

References

Cycle racing in Wales
National road cycling championships
National championships in Wales
Annual sporting events in the United Kingdom
Annual events in Wales
Cycle races in Wales